Deirdre Bolger (born 27 July 1938) is a former Irish Fine Gael politician. She was elected to Seanad Éireann on the Industrial and Commercial Panel in 1981 and was re-elected in 1982. In the 1985 local elections, she was elected to Wexford County Council for the Gorey area and served until 2004.

References

1938 births
Living people
Fine Gael senators
Members of the 15th Seanad
Members of the 16th Seanad
20th-century women members of Seanad Éireann
Politicians from County Wexford
People from Gorey